Alhabia is a municipality of Almería province, in Spain.

Demographics

References

External links
  Alhabia - Diputación Provincial de Almería

Municipalities in the Province of Almería